John Shaw Flint (25 December 1919 – 3 December 2007) was an Australian rules footballer who played with Footscray in the Victorian Football League (VFL).

Flint served in the Australian Army during World War Two.

Notes

External links 
		

1919 births
2007 deaths
Australian rules footballers from Melbourne
Western Bulldogs players
West Footscray Football Club players
People from Footscray, Victoria